Ukraine Air Enterprise (Derzhavne aviatsiine pidpryiemstvo "Ukrayina") is a government-owned airline based in Kyiv, Ukraine. It was established and started operations in 1996 and operates wet-lease flights on behalf of a number of local organisations including the Ukrainian government.

Fleet

The Ukraine Air Enterprise fleet consists of the following aircraft (as of March 2018):

References

External links

Official website

Airlines of Ukraine
Airlines established in 1996
Ukrainian companies established in 1996
Government-owned companies of Ukraine
Government-owned airlines